The 1986 Camus China Masters was a professional non-ranking snooker tournament held in September 1986 in Shanghai, China.

Steve Davis won the tournament, defeating Terry Griffiths 3–0 in the final.

Main draw

References

China Masters (snooker)
1986 in snooker
1986 in Chinese sport